Floyd Levin (September 24, 1922 – January 29, 2007) was a jazz historian and writer whose articles were published in many magazines, including Down Beat, Jazz Journal International, American Rag, and Metronome.

He received several awards for his work, including the Leonard Feather Communicator Award, given annually by the Los Angeles Jazz Society. He is the author of Classic Jazz: A Personal View of the Music and the Musicians, which chronicles his first-hand encounters with many jazz musicians such as: Benny Carter, Barney Bigard, Artie Shaw, James P. Johnson and Louis Armstrong.

Levin was instrumental in raising the funds for the statue of Louis Armstrong in Louis Armstrong Park, New Orleans.

References

External links
Floyd Levin NAMM Oral History Interview (2002)

Floyd Levin Archival Collection Finding Aid

1922 births
2007 deaths
American music historians
20th-century American historians
American male non-fiction writers
20th-century American male writers